Tallinn City Archives is an archive in Tallinn, Estonia. According to the archive's statute its purposes are as follows: "collect, organize and preserve the archival materials of historical and ongoing municipal institutions of Tallinn, as well as other records of archival value which are important to the study of the City of Tallinn and its history, and guarantee public access to them".

Directors
 1883–1887 Theodor Schiemann
 1887–1900 Gotthard von Hansen
 1900–1934 Otto Greiffenhagen
 1934–1939 Paul Johansen
 1939–1944 Rudolf Kenkmaa
 1944–1950 Epp Siimo
 1950–1962 Alide Vain
 1962–1989 Edda-Cary Vendla
 1989–1996 Jüri Kivimäe
 1996–2007 Urmas Oolup
 2009– Küllo Arjakas

References

External links
 

Archives in Estonia
Tallinn